Pure Pleasure is the second album from The Dynamic Superiors on Motown Records.  It was released in 1975. After a 35-year wait, in 2010,  this album was finally released on CD in a 2-for-1 set with The Superiors'  first Motown album, The Dynamic Superiors, not by Motown, but by Universal's Soul Music.com imprint. The album was arranged by Horace Ott, Al Gorgoni, William Eaton and Paul Riser. The cover photography is by Olivier Ferrand.

Track listing
All tracks composed by Nickolas Ashford and Valerie Simpson; except where indicated
 "Deception"	4:49
 "Pleasure"	3:19
 "Nobody's Gonna Change Me"	5:30
 "Feeling Mellow"	4:13
 "Face The Music"	3:08
 "Hit and Run Lovers"	4:06
 "A Better Way" (Bobby Gene Hall, Jr., Ray Simpson)	3:38
 "Don't Give Up On Me Baby"	3:03
 "Ain't Nothing Like The Real Thing"	4:13

References

1975 albums
Dynamic Superiors albums
Albums arranged by Horace Ott
Albums arranged by Paul Riser
Albums produced by Ashford & Simpson
1975 in LGBT history
Motown albums